The 1987 Mercedes Cup,  was a men's tennis tournament played on outdoor clay courts and held at the Tennis Club Weissenhof in Stuttgart, West Germany that was part of the 1987 Grand Prix circuit. It was the 10th edition of the tournament and was held from 13 July until 19 July 1987. First-seeded Miloslav Mečíř won the singles title.

Finals

Singles

 Miloslav Mečíř defeated  Jan Gunnarsson, 6–0, 6–2
 It was Mečíř's 5th singles title of the year and the 8th of his career.

Doubles

 Rick Leach /  Tim Pawsat defeated  Mikael Pernfors /  Magnus Tideman, 6–3, 6–4

References

External links
 Official website 
 ATP tournament profile

Stuttgart Open
Stuttgart Open
1987 in German tennis
Mercedes Cup